"Touch" is a song performed by British singer-songwriter Natasha Bedingfield. The song written by Bedingfield, Julian Bunetta and Steve Kipner was released to the US iTunes Store on 18 May 2010 as the lead single from her third studio album, Strip Me, which came out in late 2010. The song was sent to US radio on 29 June 2010 and then later confirmed to be a trailer single, whilst the album's title track serves as the first official single.

Critical reception 
Becky Bain of 'Idolator' liked the song saying "it won her over". She said "The verses seem a bit rambling (Natasha basically runs through every errand she did that day), but the catchy chorus of 'we danced, and we laughed, and we touched' wins us over. And we’re fairly certain it will inevitably be played on our TVs ad nauseam during iPod Touch commercials."

Music video 
Rich Lee was booked to direct the video which was filmed in the first week of July 2010. Lee is best known for his work with The Black Eyed Peas. 13 July, outtakes from the video were released on Bedingfield's official site and YouTube account. The video was released to the singer's official Vevo account on 27 July 2010.

Promotion 
It has been revealed that "Touch" will be used as the theme song for an upcoming NIVEA skincare campaign. Of the partnership which will involved the song being featured in TV commercials Bedingfield said "I've never been happier than I am right now ... I just celebrated my one-year wedding anniversary with the love of my life, and my new album, which I'm very proud of, will be released this fall.  When I heard about NIVEA's Happiness campaign, I couldn't think of a better way to share my new song, 'Touch,' with fans.  When you feel happy, it's contagious!" Bedingfield performed the song live for the first time on The Ellen DeGeneres Show on 24 May 2010. She performed the song for a second time on So You Think You Can Dance on 8 July 2010. On 19 July, Bedingfield performed the song at the VH1 Do Something Awards.

Remix 
"Touch" was officially remixed by The Dirty Tees. The remix was released in December 2010.

Charts

Release history

Radio adds

Release

Notes 

2010 singles
Natasha Bedingfield songs
Dance-pop songs
Songs written by Natasha Bedingfield
Songs written by Steve Kipner
Epic Records singles
Songs written by Julian Bunetta
2010 songs
Music videos directed by Rich Lee